Panna Maria (Polish for Virgin Mary) is a small unincorporated community in Karnes County, Texas, United States. It is the oldest Polish settlement in the United States.

History
A Franciscan missionary, Father Leopold Moczygemba, started recruiting Upper Silesians in 1852, when Silesia belonged to the Kingdom of Prussia. The immigrants began arriving at Indianola in early December 1854. With carts to haul them inland being scarce, the immigrants walked to their land grants near San Antonio and the town was settled on Christmas Eve in 1854.

The town's identity as an insular Polish enclave was sealed by four factors: 
Bypassed by the railroads
Union in sympathy (Settlers were also unionist and were occasionally massacred in Texas during this period)
Polish Resurrectionist priests arrived from Europe
A sisterhood of Polish teaching nuns was established

The Texas Silesian dialect has continued to be spoken for several generations.

The Panna Maria Historic District is listed on the National Register of Historic Places.

See also

National Register of Historic Places listings in Karnes County, Texas
Recorded Texas Historic Landmarks in Karnes County

References

External links

Official website of Panna Maria, Texas
"Panna Maria" Handbook of Texas Online.
Stanley S. (1976). In Quest of a Cultural Identity: An Inquiry for the Polish Community. New York, New York: IUME, Teachers College, Columbia University. ISBN ERIC ED167674.
Overview in info-poland.buffalo.edu - part 1, Part 2
THE EARLY HISTORY OF PANNA MARIA, TEXAS by Thomas Lindsay Baker

Unincorporated communities in Texas
Polish-American culture in Texas
Silesian-American culture in Texas
Silesian-American history
Silesian emigrants to the United States
Populated places established in 1854
Unincorporated communities in Karnes County, Texas
Polish communities in the United States
1854 establishments in Texas